The 1889–90 Football League was the second season of English league football, with Preston North End being crowned as the champions for the second successive season. The clubs competing were the 12 original clubs which were the founders of the league the previous year. Unlike the modern system, two points were awarded for a win, with one for a draw and no points for a loss; this system was carried on until the 1980s when teams were awarded three points for a win.

Final league table
During the first five seasons of the league, that is until the season 1893–94 re-election process concerned the clubs which finished in the bottom four of the league.

Results

Maps

Re-election process
At the Football League election meeting no vote was taken, and it was agreed that Burnley and Notts County were re-elected and that Sunderland was elected in place of Stoke, who played in the Football Alliance the following season but returned to the Football League after a year's absence.

The applications of Football Alliance sides Bootle, Darwen, Grimsby Town, Newton Heath and Sunderland Albion were rejected.

See also
1889–90 in English football
1889 in association football
1890 in association football

References

External links

Ian Laschke: Rothmans Book of Football League Records 1888–89 to 1978–79. Macdonald and Jane's, London & Sydney, 1980.

1889-90
1
1889–90 in English football